Arthur Lee Shell Jr. (born November 26, 1946) is an American former professional football player and coach. He played as an offensive tackle in the American Football League (AFL) and later in the National Football League (NFL) for the Oakland / Los Angeles Raiders. He was later a two-time head coach for the Raiders.  He holds the distinction of becoming the second African American head coach in the history of professional football and the first in the sport's modern era. Shell was inducted to the College Football Hall of Fame in 2013 and the Pro Football Hall of Fame in 1989. He played college football at Maryland State.

Playing career
Shell was drafted by the American Football League's Oakland Raiders from Maryland State College (now known as the University of Maryland, Eastern Shore). Playing offensive tackle, Shell participated in 24 playoff contests, including Super Bowls XI and XV, and was named to eight Pro Bowls.

Shell was elected to the Pro Football Hall of Fame in 1989. In 1999, he was ranked number 55 on The Sporting News''' list of the 100 Greatest Football Players.

Coaching career

Los Angeles Raiders
Through Al Davis, Shell is a member of the Sid Gillman coaching tree.  As coach of the Raiders (at the time located in Los Angeles), Shell compiled a record of 54 wins, 38 losses, and was named AFC Coach of the Year in 1990, when the Raiders won the AFC West division with a 12–4 record, and advanced to the AFC championship game in the playoffs, becoming the first African-American coach to lead the team to the Conference Championship game. Al Davis, owner of the Raiders, fired Shell after a 9–7 season in 1994, a move Davis later called "a mistake."

After the Raiders
After leaving the Raiders, Shell went on to coaching positions with the Kansas City Chiefs and Atlanta Falcons, before serving as a senior vice president for the NFL, in charge of football operations.

2006 return to Raiders
Shell was officially re-hired by the-then Oakland Raiders as head coach on February 11, 2006. After leading the team to its worst record (2 wins, 14 losses) since 1962, despite having one of the best defenses, Shell was fired for the second time as head coach of the Raiders on January 4, 2007.

Head coaching record

Personal life
Shell attended Bonds-Wilson High School in North Charleston, South Carolina. The school is no longer in existence.  Shell is an alumnus of Maryland State College, now known as the University of Maryland Eastern Shore, located in Princess Anne, Maryland. Shell is a member of Alpha Phi Alpha fraternity.  In 2013, he was inducted into the College Football Hall of Fame. He hosts an annual celebrity golf tournament.

Shell is the father of Billie Dureyea Shell, the author of the Unfaithful'' book trilogy, and the great uncle of Brandon Shell, an offensive lineman who was drafted in 2016 by the New York Jets.

See also
 List of American Football League players
 Bay Area Sports Hall of Fame

References

External links

 
 

1946 births
Living people
African-American coaches of American football
African-American players of American football
American Conference Pro Bowl players
American Football League All-Star players
American Football League players
American football offensive tackles
Atlanta Falcons coaches
College Football Hall of Fame inductees
Kansas City Chiefs coaches
Los Angeles Raiders coaches
Los Angeles Raiders head coaches
Los Angeles Raiders players
Maryland Eastern Shore Hawks football players
Oakland Raiders head coaches
Oakland Raiders players
People from North Charleston, South Carolina
Players of American football from South Carolina
Pro Football Hall of Fame inductees
Sportspeople from Charleston, South Carolina
21st-century African-American people
20th-century African-American sportspeople
National Football League executives